Richard Smith (born October 17, 1955) is an American football coach who is the linebackers coach for the Indianapolis Colts of the National Football League (NFL). He has been defensive coordinator for the Atlanta Falcons,  as well as the Houston Texans and Miami Dolphins, and a linebacker coach for the Los Angeles Chargers and Las Vegas Raiders.

Coaching career

Denver Broncos 
Smith was hired by the Denver Broncos on January 25, 2011.

Atlanta Falcons 
When the Atlanta Falcons hired Smith on January 26, 2015, the Falcons were the worst-ranked defense in passing yards in 2014 prior to his arrival. He was fired by the Falcons after their defensive collapse in Super Bowl LI, with defensive leadership being taken over by head coach Dan Quinn midway through the season.

Los Angeles Chargers 
Smith was hired by the Los Angeles Chargers on February 13, 2017, as a linebackers coach.

Las Vegas Raiders 
Smith was hired by the Las Vegas Raiders on January 12, 2021, as a linebackers coach.

References

1955 births
Living people
Arizona State Sun Devils football coaches
Atlanta Falcons coaches
Denver Broncos coaches
Detroit Lions coaches
Carolina Panthers coaches
Houston Oilers coaches
Houston Texans coaches
Las Vegas Raiders coaches
Los Angeles Chargers coaches
Miami Dolphins coaches
National Football League defensive coordinators
San Francisco 49ers coaches
Indianapolis Colts coaches